Siim Troost (born 7 December 1999) is an Estonian tennis player.

Troost has a career high ATP singles ranking of 1578, achieved on 23 August 2021. He also has a career high doubles ranking of 1379, achieved on 13 September 2021. Troost has won 1 ITF doubles title.

Troost represents Estonia at the Davis Cup, where he has a W/L record of 0–1.

Troost currently plays college tennis at Vanderbilt University. He previously played for the University of Minnesota. While at Vanderbilt University, Troost played primarily in the 6 singles position. He dominated the SEC.

References

External links

Siim Troost at the University of Minnesota
Siim Troost at the Vanderbilt University

1999 births
Living people
Estonian male tennis players
Minnesota Golden Gophers men's tennis players
Vanderbilt Commodores men's tennis players
Sportspeople from Tallinn
21st-century Estonian people